Geneviève Guérard (born April 19, 1973) is a Canadian dancer and television presenter living in Quebec. She was born in La Prairie. She studied at the École supérieure de ballet du Québec. Guérard joined Les Grands Ballets Canadiens in 1992 as an apprentice; from 1999 to 2006, she was principal dancer.

Guérard was spokesperson for Le Défi. J'arrête, j'y gagne!, a program to help people stop smoking.

In 2013, she opened a yoga studio.

References 

1973 births
Living people
Canadian ballerinas
Canadian female dancers
Canadian television hosts
People from La Prairie, Quebec
Canadian women television hosts